Brachymyrmex patagonicus is a species of ant in the family Formicidae.

Subspecies
These three subspecies belong to the species Brachymyrmex patagonicus:
 Brachymyrmex patagonicus atratulus Santschi, 1923 i c g
 Brachymyrmex patagonicus cordemoyi g
 Brachymyrmex patagonicus patagonicus Mayr, 1868 i c g
Data sources: i = ITIS, c = Catalogue of Life, g = GBIF, b = Bugguide.net

References

Further reading

External links

 

Formicinae
Articles created by Qbugbot
Insects described in 1868